The University of Agriculture, Makurdi (UAM) is a higher education institution in Makurdi, Benue State, Nigeria.

The university was established in 1988, following the recommendations of a 1987 federal government White Paper on Higher Education curriculum and development in Nigeria. The vice-chancellor is Professor Anande Richard Kimbir, and the chancellor is the Emir of Ilorin, Alhaji Ibrahim Sulu Gambari CFR. On 14 July 2019, President Muhammadu Buhari approved a bill renaming it the Joseph Sarwuan Tarka University.

Faculties
The University of Agriculture, Makurdi has over 30 departments in ten colleges:
College of Agronomy
College of Agricultural Economics and Extension 
College of Engineering
College of Animal Science  
College of Food Technology and Human Ecology
College of Sciences
College of Agricultural and Science Education
College of Veterinary Medicine
College of Forestry and Fisheries
College of Management Science

For outreach and public service support, UAM has established a Co-operative Extension Centre (CEC) and a Centre for Food and Agricultural Strategy (CEFAS) which focus on practical agricultural extension liaison support and public policy support services, respectively.

Research and extension programmes
Root and Tubers programme 
Cereals and Legumes programme 
Forestry and Horticulture programme 
Ruminants programme 
Non-ruminants programme 
Farming systems programme 
Socio-economics programme 
Rural infrastructures programme 
Agricultural Mechanization programme 
Environmental and Analytical Studies programme and Food Processing and Utilization programme
The Cooperative Extension Centre through its training and extension liaison services coordinates the outreach programmes. The Centre for Food and Agricultural Strategy coordinates the public service support in food and agriculture. UAM is forming links to ensure that agricultural technologies and the output of its research reach average small-scale Nigerian farmers, the intended beneficiaries of the university's research and extension programmes.

Institutional links are being forged with federal and state Ministries of Agriculture and other related agencies to identify areas of collaboration and technical support from the University. The university has been involved with the International Institute of Tropical Agriculture in research on the socio-economic aspects of soybean production. The university is making its presence felt in Benue State through such collaborative programme and protects. Training programmes are being conducted for participants from other states.

See also 
Academic libraries in Nigeria

References

External links
 

Educational institutions established in 1988
1988 establishments in Nigeria
Agricultural universities and colleges in Nigeria
University of Agriculture, Makurdi
Benue State